Lime cordial is a non-alcoholic drink, made by mixing concentrated lime juice and sugar with water. Lime cordial is sometimes used as a mixer for cocktail, although it can be drunk on its own.

See also
Rose's lime juice, also known as a lime cordial
Squash (drink)

References

Drink mixers
Scottish drinks
Limes (fruit)